The 2350 class were a class of diesel locomotive built by English Electric, Rocklea for Queensland Railways in 1973–1974. All were later sold to AN Tasrail.

History

The 2350 class was built for use on the Blackwater and Moura coal lines and based at Gladstone. The class became surplus following electrification of the coal lines and in 1987 were all sold to AN Tasrail where they all entered service as the ZB class. They were very similar to the Tasrail Za class - in fact, the first four ZA class' builder's numbers follow on in sequence from the 2350s' and are followed by the 2370s'.

In 1995, one was rebuilt by Australian National's Port Augusta workshop with a raked cab similar to the EL class and renumbered ZR1, while in 1997 a second was rebuilt at AN Tasrail's Launceston workshops with a more conventional cab as ZR2.

In 2003, three were sold to South Spur Rail Services, with two shipped to Western Australia to operate infrastructure trains with the fourth stripped for parts in Launceston, eventually being owned by Greentrains. Finally being scrapped in 2016, with the sole remaining WAGR R class, after being left exposed to heavy vandalism.

The remaining four Locomotives are in storage, at TasRail's East Tamar workshops having been out of use since early 2014. One of these, ZB 5/2123 (2352), has been preserved by Launceston & North East Railway. It was finally delivered to their Lilydale yard on 27 May 2022, making it the first of its class in preservation.

References

External links 

Co-Co locomotives
Diesel locomotives of Queensland
Diesel locomotives of Tasmania
Diesel locomotives of Western Australia
English Electric locomotives
Queensland Rail locomotives
Railway locomotives introduced in 1973
3 ft 6 in gauge locomotives of Australia
Diesel-electric locomotives of Australia